Katie Archibald,  (born 12 March 1994) is an elite Scottish and British racing cyclist, specialising in endurance track cycling events in which she represents Great Britain and Scotland.

A member of the Great Britain 2016 Olympic champion and 2020 Olympic silver medallists team in women's team pursuit, she is a champion in the same event at both the World (2014) and European (2013, 2014, 2015, 2018, 2019, 2020 and 2023) championships and former world record holder. She also holds an Olympic gold medal after winning the inaugural women's Madison race at the 2020 Olympic Games in Tokyo with her partner, Laura Kenny.

Individually, Archibald has been European champion in the elimination race in 2015, four times in the omnium in 2016, 2017, 2021 and 2023, in the scratch race in 2021, the women's madison twice in 2021 and 2023 and a four time European champion in the individual pursuit between 2013 and 2017. In 2017 she secured her first individual global title, winning the Omnium at the 2017 UCI Track Cycling World Championships and won a third world championship the following year when partnering Emily Nelson to win the Madison at the 2018 UCI Track Cycling World Championships. In 2021 she won her second individual world title, with a second world Omnium title.

Archibald's 20 gold medals in European elite track championships is an all-time record for that championships. She also holds the women's British national record for the individual pursuit.

Her brother, John, is also an elite cyclist who has represented Great Britain and Scotland. Both won medals at the 2018 Commonwealth Games representing Scotland; Katie won gold in the women's individual pursuit and John silver in the men's.

Early life and career
Archibald was privately educated at  The Glasgow Academy. She has a sporting background in swimming and took up cycling relatively late, taking it up competitively in 2011 on the grass track and in 2012 on hard track.

After spending 2012–2013 working in the family business (Archers Sleepcentre) as a telesales operator, she was recruited into British Cycling's Olympic Development Academy in November 2013.

Track
Archibald made her Great Britain debut at the 2013 European Track Championships. Alongside Laura Trott, Dani King and Elinor Barker, she won the gold medal and broke the world record twice in the team pursuit.

At the 2013–14 Track World Cup first round in Manchester, while riding for the Scottish Braveheart team, Archibald claimed silver in the scratch race and bronze in the points race. Recalled to the Great Britain team for the 2013–14 Track World Cup second round in Aguascalientes, Archibald was part of the quartet that won gold and broke the world record again in the team pursuit competition.

She then became Scotland's first female track cycling world champion, when she was part of the team that won the team pursuit title at the 2014 World Track Championships. Archibald won the gold medal in the same event, and another in the individual pursuit, at the 2014 European Track Championships. Archibald represented Scotland at the Commonwealth Games in Glasgow, 2014, as she claimed a bronze medal in the points race.

At the 2015 European Track Championships, Archibald became a triple European champion, retaining the team pursuit and individual pursuit titles she won in 2014, while adding the elimination race title.

Archibald returned to competition at the European Championships winning the omnium and for the third year in a row the pursuit and claimed the silver medal in the elimination race. At the Six days of London event, Archibald won eight of the ten races to secure the women's omnium title with 15 points. Archibald then returned to Glasgow for the World Cup event, where she partnered Manon Lloyd to win the Madison event, but broke her wrist in an early fall whilst changing with Lloyd. Archibald returned from injury to finish second at the Six Days of Berlin, and followed it up by winning four titles at the national championships. At the final of the Six Day series in Mallorca, Archibald finished runner up to her team pursuit teammate Elinor Barker. Archibald then capped her track season by winning her first individual world title in the Omnium.

Archibald retained her Individual Pursuit and Omnium titles at the European Championships and was also part of the team that took the silver medal in the team pursuit.

Archibald was appointed Member of the Order of the British Empire (MBE) in the 2017 New Year Honours for services to cycling.

Archibald was chosen to be part of the UK's cycling squad at the postponed 2020 Tokyo Olympics where she was joined by Elinor Barker, Neah Evans, Laura Kenny and Josie Knight for the endurance races. She returned with a silver medal in the Women's team pursuit, but shared the inaugural gold medal in Women's Madison with Laura Kenny. In October 2021 Archibald was selected for the European Track cycling championships, winning her 15th and 16th gold medals in the Scratch race and Omnium to become the elite events most successful ever competitor.

Road
Her road cycling team Podium Ambition, formerly Pearl Izumi Sports Tours International, turned professional for the start of the 2016 UCI Women's World Tour. She, along with team-mates Sarah Storey and Joanna Rowsell, were the first riders to be named in the new line-up. Archibald joined Sheffield based Team WNT Pro Cycling for the 2017 season. During the 2017 season, Archibald finished third on stage three and four of the Semana Ciclista Valenciana. In the domestic Matrix Fitness Grand Prix Series, Archibald won round 2 in Stoke-on-Trent and finished second in the opening event in Redditch. Archibald finished second in the national road race championship and third in the British time trial championships on the Isle of Man, before taking the circuit racing championship in Sheffield.

For the 2018 season Archibald decided to join Wiggle High5 Pro Cycling.

Personal life
Archibald's partner, Scottish racing cyclist Rab Wardell, died on 23 August 2022; she revealed she had unsuccessfully tried to save his life as he entered cardiac arrest in bed beside her.

Major results

Road

2014
 1st Milk Race
 Matrix Fitness Grand Prix Series
1st Stages 1 & 3
 2nd Time trial, National Road Championships
 3rd Overall British Cycling Women's Road Series
1st Cheshire Classic
1st Curlew Cup
 Commonwealth Games
5th Time trial
7th Road race
2015
 1st London Nocturne
 1st Stage 2 Matrix Fitness Grand Prix Series
2017
 National Road Championships
1st  Criterium
2nd Road race
3rd Time trial
2018
 3rd Overall BeNe Ladies Tour
1st Prologue
 4th Time trial, Commonwealth Games
2022
 4th Overall Bloeizone Fryslân Tour

Track

2012
 National Junior Championships
1st  Individual pursuit
2nd Points race
2013
 1st  Team pursuit, UEC European Championships
 International Belgian Open
1st Points race
2nd Individual pursuit
 National Championships
2nd Madison (with Charline Joiner)
3rd Individual pursuit
 UCI World Cup
1st Team pursuit, Aguascalientes
2nd Scratch race, Manchester
3rd Individual pursuit, Manchester
2014
 1st  Team pursuit, UCI World Championships
 UEC European Championships
1st  Team pursuit
1st  Individual pursuit
 National Championships
1st  Individual pursuit
2nd Team pursuit
 1st Team pursuit, UCI World Cup, London
 Revolution
1st Points race – Round 3, Manchester
2nd Omnium – Round 1, London
2nd Points race – Round 4, Manchester
3rd Omnium – Round 5, London
 2nd Omnium, Fenioux Piste International
 3rd  Points race, Commonwealth Games
2015
 UEC European Championships
1st  Team pursuit
1st  Individual pursuit
1st  Elimination race
 National Championships
1st  Team pursuit
2nd Individual pursuit
2nd Scratch race
2nd Points race
 1st Omnium, Internationale Radsport Meeting
 Revolution
1st Scratch race – Round 1, Derby
2nd Points race – Round 2, Manchester
2nd Points race – Round 5, London
2nd Scratch race – Round 4, Glasgow
3rd Points race – Round 3, Manchester
3rd Points race – Round 4, Glasgow
3rd Scratch race – Round 5, London
 2nd  Team pursuit, UCI World Championships
 2nd  Individual pursuit, UEC European Under-23 Championships
 3rd Team pursuit, UCI World Cup, Cali
2016
 1st  Team pursuit, Olympic Games
 UEC European Championships
1st  Individual pursuit
1st  Omnium
2nd  Elimination
 1st Madison (with Manon Lloyd), UCI World Cup, Glasgow
 1st Omnium, Six Days of London
 2nd Omnium, Fenioux Piste International
 2nd Points race, Revolution – Round 2, Glasgow
2017
 1st  Omnium, UCI World Championships
 UEC European Championships
1st  Individual pursuit
1st  Omnium
2nd  Team pursuit
 National Championships
1st  Individual pursuit
1st  Points race
1st  Scratch race
1st  Omnium
2nd Keirin
 UCI World Cup
1st Madison, Manchester (with Elinor Barker)
1st Madison, Milton (with Ellie Dickinson)
1st Points race, Milton
1st Team pursuit, Manchester
2nd Omnium, Manchester
 International Cycling Meeting
1st Madison (with Ellie Dickinson)
1st Omnium
 Six Days of Fiorenzuola
1st Madison (with Emily Nelson)
1st Omnium
1st Points race
1st Scratch race
 1st Overall Six Days of London
1st Omnium
2nd Madison (with Lydia Boylan)
3rd Scratch race
 Round 1, Revolution Series Champions League
1st Points race
1st Scratch race
 2nd Omnium, Six Days of Berlin
 2nd Omnium, Six Day Final, Mallorca
2018
 UCI World Championships
1st  Madison (with Emily Nelson)
2nd  Team pursuit
 Commonwealth Games
1st  Individual pursuit
2nd  Points race
 UEC European Championships
1st  Team pursuit
2nd  Individual pursuit
2nd  Omnium
 UCI World Cup
1st Madison, Milton (with Elinor Barker)
1st Team pursuit, Milton
1st Omnium, Berlin
1st Team pursuit, Berlin
1st Madison, London (with Laura Kenny)
1st Team pursuit, London
 National Championships
1st  Individual pursuit
1st  Scratch race
1st  Points race
1st  Madison (with Elinor Barker)
3rd Sprint
 Round 3, Revolution Series Champions League
1st Scratch race
2nd Points race
2019
UEC European Championships
1st  Team pursuit
2nd  Madison (with Laura Kenny)
3rd  Individual pursuit
 National Championships
1st  Individual pursuit
3rd Points race
3rd Scratch race
3rd Sprint
 UCI World Cup, Glasgow
1st Team pursuit
2nd Madison (with Elinor Barker)
 Six Day Manchester
1st Madison (with Neah Evans)
1st Omnium
 1st Omnium, Six Day Finals – Brisbane
 6 Giorni delle Rose – Fiorenzuola
1st Madison
2nd Omnium
 Orlen Grand Prix
1st Madison (with Neah Evans)
1st Points race
 Six Day London
1st Madison (with Neah Evans)
1st Omnium
2nd Scratch race
 2nd  Team pursuit, UCI World Championships
2020
 UEC European Championships
1st  Points race
1st  Team pursuit
 2nd  Team pursuit, UCI World Championships
2021
 Olympic Games
1st  Madison (with Laura Kenny)
2nd  Team pursuit
 UCI World Championships
1st  Omnium
2nd  Points race
3rd  Team pursuit
3rd  Madison (with Neah Evans)
 UEC European Championships
1st  Omnium
1st  Madison (with Neah Evans)
1st  Scratch race
 1st  Overall Endurance, UCI Champions League
1st Elimination race, Palma
1st Scratch race, Panevėžys
1st Elimination race, Panevėžys
1st Elimination race, London I
1st Elimination race, London II
2nd Scratch race, London II
3rd Scratch race, London I
2022
 2nd  Team pursuit, UCI Nations Cup, Glasgow
2023
 UEC European Championships
1st  Omnium
1st  Team pursuit
1st  Madison (with Elinor Barker)

Championships timeline

References

External links
 
 
 
 

1994 births
Living people
Sportspeople from East Dunbartonshire
Scottish female cyclists
Medalists at the 2016 Summer Olympics
Medalists at the 2020 Summer Olympics
Cyclists at the 2014 Commonwealth Games
Cyclists at the 2018 Commonwealth Games
UCI Track Cycling World Champions (women)
Commonwealth Games gold medallists for Scotland
Commonwealth Games bronze medallists for Scotland
Cyclists at the 2016 Summer Olympics
Cyclists at the 2020 Summer Olympics
Olympic cyclists of Great Britain
Olympic gold medallists for Great Britain
Olympic silver medallists for Great Britain
Olympic medalists in cycling
Commonwealth Games medallists in cycling
Members of the Order of the British Empire
Scottish Olympic medallists
Scottish track cyclists
European Championships (multi-sport event) gold medalists
People educated at Douglas Academy
English Olympic medallists
Medallists at the 2014 Commonwealth Games
Medallists at the 2018 Commonwealth Games